Watsonian Football Club is a rugby union club based in Edinburgh and part of the Scottish Rugby Union.  The club is connected with George Watson's College as a club for former pupils, and changed its policy in the 1980s to be a fully open club, welcoming players of all abilities regardless of whether they attended the school or not. It is one of a small number of rugby union clubs entitled to call itself a 'football club', rather than a 'rugby football club'. Watsonians run a number of sides; the top male side plays in the FOSROC Super 6 tournament, the Women's side plays in the Tennents Scottish Women's Premiership Scottish Rugby's Women's League

Current squad

Table

Squads

Watsonians has four male squads and one ladies team who play in the following leagues:

 Super 6 – FOSROC Super6
 1st XV - Tennent's Scottish National League 1 
 2nd XV – Reserve League National 1
 3rd XV – Reserve League East 2
 Ladies XV – Women's Premiership

1st XV – coached by Jason Riley
2nd XV – coached by Sam Rowlands. 
3rd XV – coached by Johnny Sandlan.

Club Captain – Emily Cotterill.
Vice Captain - Jamie Hodgson.
Vice Captain - Rory Hutton.

1st XV Team

The 1st XV team enjoyed a successful 2005–06 season, winning the BT Cup and finishing second in the Scottish Premiership, Division 1. In 2012–13 season the club narrowly failed to return to the Premiership, finishing 3rd in the National League. In the most recent 2014–15 season they came 4th. The coaching team is led by ex-Scotland player Marcus Di Rollo.

Scottish Club Champions :
1891–92, 1892–93, 1893–94, 1894–95, 1896–97, 1902–03, 1908–09, 1909–10, 1910–11, 1911–12, 1913–14, 1920–21, 1934–35, 1936–37, 1969–70, 1997–98

Division 2 Champions :
1990–91, 2002–03

Scottish Cup Winners :
2006

Ladies's Section 
Watsonians also has a women's team which play in the Premiership of the Scottish Rugby's Women's League. The ladies section was formed in 2001 by a number of players from different clubs around the city.

The team are a 40 strong squad of female athletes and in the 2019/20 season are competing in the Scottish Women's Premier League for the third year in a row. They have achieved increasing success over the last few years, culminating in finishing second in the league and going on to play and win the National Sarah Beaney Cup Final on the main pitch at BT Murrayfield stadium in April 2019. This match formed part of the well-attended Scottish Rugby Silver Saturday showpiece event and represented the highest level of women's club rugby in the country; furthermore, this final was the first Scottish women's club game to be streamed live on BBC Alba.

The team is coached by Freddie Main, supported by Scott Nightingale, Lucy Brown and Duncan Wilson and is currently captained by Rachel Bragg.

History – Last 125 Years

The Watsonian Football Club played its first game on 30 January 1875 against St George that ended in a draw. Right from the beginning the emphasis was on expansive play combined with enjoying rugby football both on and off the field. With this noble aim, Watsonians has evolved and achieved many successes to confirm its place as one of the leading clubs in Scottish Rugby.

In 1876, Watsonians adopted the maroon & white colours it wears today and two years' later the Club moved to Myreside, named after a local farm. In 1877 the Club became a member of the Scottish Football Union (the SRU from 1924). Watsonians won their first Scottish Unofficial Championship in season 1891–92, but their greatest period of dominance came between 1908 and 1914 when they won the championship a further five times. The team of 1909–10 (pictured right) was undefeated against Scottish opposition during that season.

On 4 March 1933, Watsonians opened their current home at New Myreside with a victory over Royal High School FP. The Championship arrived at the new home in two of the next three seasons, but the club had to wait 33 years for the next success in season 1969–70.

In season 1973–74 the National League was introduced and Watsonians were placed in Division 1, a position the club has maintained for 24 of the 26 seasons played. It speaks volumes for the spirit at Myreside that as a closed club Watsonians managed to preserve their standing in the higher echelons for many years.

The Club relaxed their membership rules after relegation in 1989 and returned to the top level by going undefeated to win the Division II championship in 1990–91. Since their return to Division 1 Watsonians has regularly challenged for honours before regaining that elusive Scottish Championship again in season 1997–98.

Notable former players
Watsonian's first  cap was John Tod in 1884. Since then Watsonians has fielded no fewer than 62 Scottish internationalists, including five Scotland captains and seven British and Irish Lions. Watsonians have had key roles in all of Scotland's three Grand Slams to date.

In 1925 Watsonians forward A.C. Gillies played in three international matches and against  he scored one try and kicked two conversions and against  he converted a try with a superb kick from the touch line to help seal the victory in this game. James Ritchie represented Scotland in the six international matches of 1933 (Triple Crown) and 1934.

Against England in 1984, centres David Johnston and Euan Kennedy scored both Scotland's tries en route to Scotland's first Grand Slam since 1925.

Gavin and Scott Hastings played in every game of Scotland's successful Grand Slam season of 1990. In the never to be forgotten final game against England, Gavin's kick through set up the deciding try for Tony Stanger and Scott made an outstanding try saving tackle on Rory Underwood. Gavin went on to captain Scotland and the 1993 British Lions and until recently, Scott was Scotland's most capped player.

List of Watsonian Scotland Caps
 John Tod
 Herbert Leggatt
 David Deas 
 RF Kelly British & Irish Lions
 A.C. Gillies, 12 caps.
 JM Ritchie.
 David Johnston
 Euan Kennedy
 Iain Lambie
 Norman Munnoch
 Gavin Hastings British & Irish Lions
 Scott Hastings British & Irish Lions
 Tom Smith
 Jason White British & Irish Lions
 Grant McKelvey
 Stuart Grimes
 John Howard Wilson
 Eric Milroy, 12 caps.
 H.O. Smith, 11 caps
 D.M. Bertram, 11 caps.
 Alex Angus, 18 caps. also played for Scotland national cricket team.
 John MacCallum, 26 caps.
 George Roberts (rugby union)
 Marcus Di Rollo 21 caps
 Kyle Traynor, 3 caps.
 Donald Scott
 Louis Moritz Speirs
 Graham Ross
 John Simson
 Robert Finlay
 John Dallas
 Robert Young
 Alec Robertson
 Jimmy Carmichael

Scotland 7s Internationalist Section

 Jack Ferguson
 Andrew Skeen
 Michael Fedo
 Stuart McInally 
 Jamie Blackwood 
 Craig Sorbie
 Nick Penny
 Megan Gaffney
 Bryony Nelson
 Hannah Smith
 Lana Skeldon
 Andrew Turnbull

Honours

 Melrose Sevens
 Champions (11): 1905, 1906, 1907, 1914, 1926, 1935, 1936, 1945, 1976, 1996, 2018
 Langholm Sevens
 Champions (3): 2016, 2018, 2019
 Hawick Sevens
 Champions (4): 1906, 1950, 2004, 2018
 Gala Sevens
 Champions (7): 1905, 1996, 1997, 2003, 2005, 2016, 2017
 Berwick Sevens
 Champions (5): 2007, 2009, 2013, 2018, 2019
 Jed-Forest Sevens
 Champions (8): 1905, 1906, 1956, 1963, 2002, 2004, 2008, 2017
 Peebles Sevens
 Champions (13): 1936, 1937, 1939, 1952, 1955, 1956, 1972, 1999, 2005, 2007, 2008, 2012, 2017
 Earlston Sevens
 Champions (4): 2005, 2008, 2009, 2019
FOSROC Super 6
Champions: 2022
FOSROC Super 6 Sprint Series
Champions: 2022
 Kelso Sevens
 Champions (4): 2012, 2013, 2017, 2019
 Kings of the Sevens
 Champions (4): 2009, 2017, 2018, 2019
Walkerburn Sevens
 Champions (4): 1939, 1940, 1941, 1959
 Morningside Sevens
 Champions: 1903

See also
 Rugby union in Scotland
 The Scottish 2nd XV League

External links
Official site

References
 Bath, Richard (ed.) The Scotland Rugby Miscellany (Vision Sports Publishing Ltd, 2007 )
 Godwin, Terry Complete Who's Who of International Rugby (Cassell, 1987)
 Jones, J.R. Encyclopedia of Rugby Union Football (Robert Hale, London, 1976 )
 Massie, Allan A Portrait of Scottish Rugby (Polygon, Edinburgh)

Rugby clubs established in 1875
1875 establishments in Scotland
Scottish rugby union teams
Rugby union in Edinburgh
Sports teams in Edinburgh